This is a list of Australian Greens Members of Parliament, past and present, for Federal, State and Territory Parliaments of Australia. There are currently 33 serving Parliamentary Members of the Greens.

The Greens are currently represented in the Australian House of Representatives, the Australian Senate, the New South Wales Legislative Assembly, the New South Wales Legislative Council, the Victorian Legislative Assembly, the Victorian Legislative Council, the Legislative Assembly of Queensland, the Western Australian Legislative Council, the South Australian Legislative Council, the Tasmanian House of Assembly, and the ACT Legislative Assembly. The Greens have previously been represented in the South Australian House of Assembly and the Western Australian Legislative Assembly.

List of parliamentarians

Greens representation from year to year

The table below represents the parliamentary representation of Greens politicians from 1983 to the present. Bob Brown was the first elected Greens representative, initially elected to the Tasmanian House of Assembly in 1983. He was joined by Gerry Bates in 1986.

Federal parliamentarians timeline

House of Representatives

Senate

References 

Greens parliamentarians